South Aspen Street Historic District is a national historic district in Lincolnton, Lincoln County, North Carolina. It encompasses 46 contributing buildings and one contributing structure in a predominantly residential section of town. It includes examples of Greek Revival and Queen Anne style architecture dating between about 1852 and 1950. Buildings include the Wallace H. Alexander House (1852), Banett-Hoyle House (1852), the former Lincoln/Gordon Crowell Memorial Hospital, the former Lincolnton High School, John M. Rhodes House, the David P. Rhodes House, the C. William Rhodes House, and the John D. Abernathy House.

It was listed on the National Register of Historic Places in 2003.

References

Historic districts on the National Register of Historic Places in North Carolina
Greek Revival architecture in North Carolina
Queen Anne architecture in North Carolina
Buildings and structures in Lincoln County, North Carolina
National Register of Historic Places in Lincoln County, North Carolina